{{Infobox Italian comune
| name                = Grimacco
| official_name       = Comune di Grimacco
| native_name         = 
| image_skyline       = Topolovo-Topolo, Grmek-Grimacco.jpg
| imagesize           = 230px
| image_alt           = 
| image_caption       = The village of Topolò (Topolovo) in the municipality of Grimacco
| image_shield        = 
| shield_alt          = 
| image_map           = 
| map_alt             = 
| map_caption         = 
| pushpin_label_position = 
| pushpin_map_alt     = 
| coordinates         = 
| coordinates_footnotes = 
| region              = Friuli-Venezia Giulia
| province            = Province of Udine (UD)
| frazioni            = Brida superiore (Gorenje Bardo), Brida inferiore (Dolenje Bardo), Canalaz (Kanalac), Clodig (Hlodič), Costne (Hostne), Dolina (Dolina), Grimacco Inferiore (Dolenji Garmak), Grimacco Superiore (Gorenji Garmak), Liessa (Liesa), Lombai (Lombaj), Plataz (Platac), Podlach (Podlak), Seuza (Selce), Slapovicco (Slapovik), Sverinaz (Zverinac), Topolò (Topolove), Ville di Mezzo.
| mayor_party         = Lista civica
| mayor               = Eliana Fabello 25 May 2014
| area_footnotes      = 
| area_total_km2      = 16.4
| population_footnotes = 
| population_total    = 342
| population_as_of    = 2015
| pop_density_footnotes = 
| population_demonym  = 
| elevation_footnotes = 
| elevation_m         = 
| twin1               = 
| twin1_country       = 
| saint               = Valentine
| day                 = 14 February
| postal_code         = 33040
| area_code           = 0432
| website             = institutional website
| footnotes           = 

Grimacco localities include Brida superiore (Gorenje Bardo), Brida inferiore (Dolenje Bardo), Canalaz (Kanalac), Clodig (Hlodič), Costne (Hostne), Dolina (Dolina), Grimacco Inferiore (Dolenji Garmak), Grimacco Superiore (Gorenji Garmak), Liessa (Liesa), Lombai (Lombaj), Plataz (Platac), Podlach (Podlak), Seuza (Selce'), Slapovicco (Slapovik), Sverinaz (Zverinac), Topolò (Topolove''), Ville di Mezzo. Municipal hall is located in Clodig.

Ethnic composition

93.7% of the population were Slovenes according to the 1971 census.

Demographic evolution

Gallery

References

See also
Venetian Slovenia
Friuli
Slovene Lands

Cities and towns in Friuli-Venezia Giulia